Story of the Vulture Conqueror is a two-part Hong Kong film adapted from Louis Cha's novel The Legend of the Condor Heroes. The first part was released in 1958 while the second part was released in the following year. The film was directed by Wu Pang and starred Cho Tat-wah and Yung Siu-yee in the leading roles.

Cast
 Note: Some of the characters' names are in Cantonese romanisation.

 Cho Tat-wah as Kwok Ching
 Yung Siu-yee as Wong Yung / Fung Hang
 Lam Kau as Yeung Hong
 Lai Kwan-lin as Muk Nim-chi
 Lee Ching as Yeung Tit-sam
 Mui Yee as Pau Si-yeuk
 Lau Siu-man as Kwok Siu-tin / Chow Pak-tung
 Lee Heung-kam as Lee Ping
 Shih Kien as Wong Yeuk-see
 Ling Mung as Hung Tsat-kung
 Lam Lo-ngok as Au-yeung Fung / Jebe
 Chan Lap-pan as Mui Chiu-fung
 Ho Siu-hung as Kau Chin-yan
 Yeung Yip-wang as Wong Chung-yeung
 Wong Chor-san as Wong Chui-yat
 Siu Hon-sang as Or Chan-ngok
 Ng Yan-chi as Chu Chung
 Chan Yiu-lam as Hon Po-kui
 Chow Siu-loi as Nam Hei-yan
 Wu Ka as Hon Siu-ying
 Tsui Sung-hok as Chuen Kam-fat
 Tong Ka as Cheung Ah-sang
 Ho San as Yuen-ngan Hung-lit
 Yuen Siu-tien as Leung Tsi-yung
 Chu Chiu as Tuen Tin-tak
 Chan Kam-tong as Luk Sing-fung
 Mak Sin-shing as Luk Koon-ying

External links
 
 

1958 films
1959 films
1950s Cantonese-language films
Films based on The Legend of the Condor Heroes
Films based on works by Jin Yong
Films released in separate parts
Films set in the Mongol Empire
Hong Kong martial arts films
Wuxia films